Chris Phillips is the former Dean of the Faculty of Natural Sciences and head of the Optoelectronics section at Imperial College London.

Career
Phillips travelled in the developing world and worked for the BBC before taking up a faculty position in the Physics department of Imperial College London in 1985, at the age of 27. He was a visiting researcher at the Quantum Institute, University of California, Santa Barbara in 1997–98. He was elected a Fellow of the Institute of Physics in 2006, and served as Dean of the Faculty of Natural Sciences at Imperial College London from 2008 to 2011.

His  research centres on the optical properties of semiconductor nanostructures. He is known for his work on electromagnetically induced transparency (EIT), a quantum optical effect whereby a crystal can be made to effectively disappear when it is illuminated by a sufficiently powerful invisible laser.

Most recently he is applying the techniques and devices developed over his research career to make ultra-efficient solar cells, and "Quantum Metamaterials" . The latter can be used to make new types of optical components, e.g. "superlenses" that beat the normal limits to image sharpness imposed by the laws of diffraction.

In a departure from physics into the world of medicine he is developing, and now clinically trailing, a new "Digistain" imaging technology. This enables one to image human tissue in a new way that reveals the chemical changes that accompany the onset of cancer. It promises to be a better way to detect and monitor the disease.

Phillips takes particular interest in the dissemination of knowledge to his students and to the public at large. He is known for using practical demonstrations in his lectures to illustrate critical points; for example illuminating the nature of quantum operators through their likeness to sausage machines. He believes that the fruits of scientific research should be made accessible to all, and he regularly gives media interviews and public demonstration lectures at schools and science fairs at home and abroad. In 1997 he won the Imperial College Excellence in Teaching Award.

Personal life
Phillips grew up in Cullercoats, a coastal town of population 10,000, in the North East of England, but his family moved south for work at an early age. He lives with his partner of many years in West London and they have two grown-up children.

He enjoys adventure, music and travel. He lists his interests as Family, Cycling, distance rowing, hill-walking, catamaran racing, skiing and snowboarding.  He occasionally 'performs' in a Latin jazz ensemble, and it is rumoured that he also prolifically releases solo work under a pseudonym. He has cycled from John O’Groats to Land's end in 2011 and sailed the Fastnet race in 2015. He has rowed across the English Channel 3 times for charities, most notably in 2013, when he was part of a crew that won a non-stop 7-day 500 mile London-to-Paris rowing race, which he often cites as his greatest achievement.

References

External links
 https://web.archive.org/web/20110225020305/http://www3.imperial.ac.uk/people/chris.phillips

British physicists
Living people
Year of birth missing (living people)
Academics of Imperial College London
Fellows of the Institute of Physics